Magdalena Ortega de Nariño (July 22, 1762 – June 16, 1811) was the wife of independence leader Antonio Nariño and mother of their six children.

1762 births
1811 deaths
People from Bogotá